The , branded , is a limited express electric multiple unit (EMU) train type operated by the private railway operator Tobu Railway in Japan since 1990. The trains are used on Kegon, Spacia Nikko, Kinu, and Spacia Kinugawa services to Nikkō and Kinugawa-Onsen.

Formation
, the fleet consists of nine sets, based at Kasukabe Depot, and formed as follows.

Interior
Car 6 contains six 4-seat compartments. These are marked as "Green cars" when operating on JR lines.

History
The 100 series trains entered service on 1 June 1990 on Kegon and Kinu services from Asakusa in Tokyo to Nikkō and Kinugawa-Onsen, replacing the ageing 1720 series trains operating since 1960. Two sets were delivered in fiscal 1989, two more were delivered in fiscal 1990, and five were delivered in fiscal 1991, bringing the fleet to nine sets.

All cars were made no-smoking from 18 March 1995.

On 11 November 2021, Tobu announced that the 100 series fleet would be replaced with new N100 series trains which are slated for introduction in 2023.

JR inter-running
Through-running Spacia Nikkō and Spacia Kinugawa services from Shinjuku in Tokyo to Tōbu Nikkō and Kinugawa-Onsen via the JR Tōhoku Main Line commenced on 18 March 2006, and three sets (106 to 108) were modified with JR ATS-P for use on JR East lines.

Refurbishment
The fleet underwent a programme of refurbishment from December 2011, ahead of the opening of the Tokyo Skytree in May 2012. Three trains each were repainted into three different colour schemes, with "miyabi" purple, "iki" light blue, and "sunny coral orange", matching the Tokyo Skytree theme colours, and new "Spacia" logos. Internally, the seats feature new moquette, with blue in the open saloons and brown in the compartments. The first refurbished set re-entered service from 29 December 2011.

"Nikko Moude Spacia" sets
Set 103 was repainted in a special gold and black livery and branded  from April 2015. This was followed in July 2015 by set 106, which was similarly reliveried.

References

External links

 Tobu 100 series information 

Electric multiple units of Japan
100 series
Train-related introductions in 1990
Alna Koki rolling stock
Tokyu Car multiple units
1500 V DC multiple units of Japan